4/6 may refer to:
April 6 (month-day date notation)
June 4 (day-month date notation)
4 shillings and 6 pence in UK predecimal currency